is a Japanese actress and model who is affiliated with Avex Vanguard. She played the role of Kasumi Momochi (Momo Ninger) in the 2015 Super Sentai TV series, Shuriken Sentai Ninninger.

Biography
In 2007, Yamaya, who was born in Miyagi Prefecture, passed the Actor Talent Model Audition application which was sponsored by the Avex Group. In 2008, she debuted in the drama Change. In the same year, Yamaya appeared in the drama Love Letter. In 2009, she started modeling as an exclusive model for the magazine Nico Petit. As of October 2013, Yamaya is currently represented by Avex Vanguard, Avex Group's spin-off office.

Filmography

TV series

Films

References

External links

 Official profile at Avex Vanguard 
 

Japanese female models
Japanese film actresses
Japanese television actresses
1996 births
Living people
Models from Miyagi Prefecture
Actors from Miyagi Prefecture
21st-century Japanese actresses